I Won't Play is a 1944 American short drama film directed by Crane Wilbur. It won an Oscar at the 17th Academy Awards in 1945 for Best Short Subject (Two-Reel).

Cast
 Dane Clark as Joe Fingers
 Janis Paige as Kim Karol / Sally
 Warren Douglas as Rusty aka 'Handsome'
 Robert Shayne as Chaplain aka 'Padre'
 William Haade as Chicago
 William 'Billy' Benedict as Florida (as William Benedict)
 Milton Kibbee as U.S.O. Show Emcee (uncredited)
 Knox Manning as Narrator (uncredited)

References

External links

1944 films
1944 drama films
1944 short films
American black-and-white films
American drama films
Films directed by Crane Wilbur
Live Action Short Film Academy Award winners
Warner Bros. short films
1940s English-language films
1940s American films